is a Japanese cooking manga series written and illustrated by Kazuki Funatsu. It was serialized in Shueisha's seinen manga magazine Weekly Young Jump from January 2001 to December 2012, with its chapters collected in 49 tankōbon volumes.

Story
Addicted to Curry is the story of Sonezaki Yui, a schoolgirl whose father is the owner of Curry House Cooking Ganesha. Yui, who frequently adopts strays and starving animals she finds on the street, one day finds a young man lying in the road and, out of her good nature, wants to give him something to eat. She trips and hits him in the face with a soda can, and runs away. The young man, Koenji Makito, follows her curry scent back to the restaurant.

At first, Yui thinks that Koenji is going to kill her for throwing food at him, but it turns out that he is a nice guy who knew and was looking for Yui's father, Sōichiro. Yui tells Makito that the restaurant is going out of business and that her father Sōichiro has left on a journey with the goal of improving his cooking abilities, pretty much leaving her alone with the restaurant. Koenji, who is in debt to both Yui and her father decides to team up with Yui in order to save the restaurant.

Characters

Main characters

Born in Singapore to Japanese parents. His life was saved by Sonezaki Sōichiro. Sonezaki promised to tell Makito about the person he was looking for if he come to Ganesha curry restaurant, but when Makito arrives there he finds that Sōichiro has left because business was doing badly. Makito decides to wait and repay Sonezaki by keeping open his restaurant. Makito can cook curry just like Sōichiro. Makito, unlike Sōichiro, strays away from the traditional idea of curry. By doing this, Makito attracts many customers and proves himself to be a shrewd cook. Makito prepares curry dishes quickly and easily. Makito also has a perverted side to him and often tries to peep and/or grope women. He sometimes watches Yui while she showers/dresses. He often has a seen with a stick of cinnamon in his mouth that makes it appear as if he is smoking, which he claims helps him stay calm and focused. He may have feelings for Yui. His father was a food critic who abandoned his mother for unknown reasons before his birth. After his mother's death in a car accident, he dreams of being a famous chef in hopes of confronting him and obtaining his notes from the time he spent with his mother, believing that they hold the key to replicating his mother's chicken curry, the only curry dish he is unable to make.
He is defeated by Sōichiro in a curry battle at the end of the first arc and decides to return to Osaka. He has since been working in a new restaurant and has, along with his new friends, roommates, and co-workers, become embroiled in a nationally televised cutthroat cooking competition known as Edible Fight.

The daughter of Sonezaki Sōichiro. She is a first year at Toritsu Shinnet High school and is in the kendou club. Yui is generally a nice, mild-mannered girl who will stop to feed any hungry animal she sees and even bring the animal home. She sometimes can be short tempered and fragile. Her father owns a curry restaurant, but when the business fails he goes to sharpen his cooking skills, leaving the restaurant to Yui. Despite the fact that her father abandoned her, Yui still loves him and his curry cooking. When Yui meets Makito she teams up with him to save the restaurant. She tries to help Makito as much as possible and comes to admire and respect his ways. She has feelings for Makito. She has recently travelled to Osaka in hopes of reuniting with Makito.

Oukarou Restaurant

The owner of the Western Cuisine Restaurant Oukarou and Youko's father. He always wear an eyepatch Youko gave him despite not being blind. Makito worked for him 2 years ago and wants him to come back even going as far as to let him have his daughter. He was later diagnosed with cancer, and walked Yōko down the aisle of a mock wedding to Makito. Although it was his wife who staged the whole cancer lie.

Yui's pretty teacher who's also an old friend of Makito. Her father is Munakata Shigemitsu. She has great respect for Makito's cooking skills. Getting drunk turns her into a violent dominatrix. She might have feelings for Makito in the past.

A young ambitious chef in training employed by Oukarou, but working with Makito and Yui at Curry House Cooking Ganesha as a return favor and as a sort of education, since no one at Oukarou has time to teach him. The first time he observed Makito, he was disappointed at Makito for not doing the way a chef is supposed to act (according to the manual chef book he has), but after Yui points out that not everybody is perfect and even Makito has his own weak spot. he starts to watch Makito and he sees that the customers enjoy his way as a chef, he now wants to learn from Makito how to cook curry. His dream is to open a curry shop of his own.

Other characters
Kanamori
Kanamori wants to buy Cooking Ganesha from Yui and he will do anything to get it as far as to give over 30 million yen. When Yui rejects the money he buys the rental cd next door to Cooking Genesha called Curry Shop - India to steal Cooking Ganesha's customers, but that does not bother Makito at all. So he asks one of the co-workers, Udou, to have a curry battle against Makito. The rules were that if Makito loses he would have to give Cooking Ganesha away to him and if they lose he will not bother them ever again, however the plan failed as Makito's food overpowered Udou's food.
Shinozaki
Shinozaki is a very large woman who frequently eats at the Ganesha curry restaurant and will defend it with all her power to keep it open. She is belligerent and short tempered. Shinozaki attends a female-only college and is a wrestler.

Yui's father and the man who saved Makito from dying of starvation long ago. He promised to tell Makito about the person he was looking for if he came to Ganesha restaurant. However, Sōichiro leaves his restaurant and his daughter to improve his curry cooking abilities. He returns at the end of the first arc, where he defeats Makito in a curry competition for the restaurant's future. The competition portrays Sōichiro as almost superhuman when he becomes focused on cooking and his dish was, despite its plain appearance, a perfect meal that encompassed the very essence of curry as a meal for friends and family.
Hatsumi Sonezaki
Hatsumi is Sōichiro's older brother's daughter and Yui's cousin. Hatsumi comes to the curry restaurant to check up on Yui, who was actually supposed to come live with her. Hatsumi reveals that she has no cooking talent and asks Yui to teach her to cook, but they both fail at making instant curry.
Urmila
Urmila is Makito Koenji's friend from high school when he lived in Singapore. Urmila is a Singaporean of Indian descent and enjoys studying and making curry with Makito.

Publication

Shueisha collected its 534 chapters in forty-nine tankōbon volumes, released from July 19, 2001, to January 18, 2013.

See also
 Yokai Girls, a manga series by the same author
 Sundome!! Milky Way, a manga series by the same author
 Dogeza: I Tried Asking While Kowtowing, a manga series by the same author

Notes

References

External links
  
  
 

Cooking in anime and manga
Seinen manga
Shueisha manga